Lavandevil (also Romanized as Lavandevīl, Lavandavil, and Lavandvīl; also known as Bāzar-e Lavandvīl, Landvīl-e Sabalī, and Lavandvīl-e Sabalī) is a city and capital of Lavandevil District, located in Astara County of Gilan Province, in far northwestern Iran.

It is between the coast of the Caspian Sea and the northeastern Alborz mountain range, located just south of Lavandevil Wildlife Refuge.

At the 2006 census, its population was 6,372, in 1,575 families.

Language 
Linguistic composition of the city.

References

Populated places in Astara County

Cities in Gilan Province

Azerbaijani settlements in Gilan Province

Talysh settlements in Gilan Province